Tetragonophthalma is a monotypic genus of Central African nursery web spiders containing the single species, Tetragonophthalma vulpina. It was first described by Ferdinand Anton Franz Karsch in 1878, and is only found in Africa.

See also
 List of Pisauridae species

References

Monotypic Araneomorphae genera
Pisauridae
Spiders of Africa